Horse Valley Bridge is a historic multi-span stone arch bridge located at Letterkenny Township in Franklin County, Pennsylvania. It was constructed before 1860. It crosses Conodoguinet Creek.

It was listed on the National Register of Historic Places in 1988.

References 

Road bridges on the National Register of Historic Places in Pennsylvania
Bridges in Franklin County, Pennsylvania
National Register of Historic Places in Franklin County, Pennsylvania
Stone arch bridges in the United States